Coneys Creek is a  long 1st order tributary to Hyco Creek in Caswell County, North Carolina.  This stream is the only one of its name in the United States.

Course
Coneys Creek rises in a pond about 0.25 miles north of Ridgeville, North Carolina, and then flows northerly to join Hyco Creek about 1 mile west of Frogsboro.

Watershed
Coneys Creek drains  of area, receives about 46.5 in/year of precipitation, has a topographic wetness index of 368.52, and is about 64% forested.

References

Rivers of North Carolina
Rivers of Caswell County, North Carolina
Tributaries of the Roanoke River